KMZE 92.3 FM is a radio station licensed to Woodward, Oklahoma. The station broadcasts a News-Talk format and is owned by FM 92 Broadcasters, Inc.

History
FM92 signed on the air in the late 80's playing adult contemporary. FM92 later changed its name to "Z92". Z92 became the "Voice of the Boomers airing Woodward Boomer Sports. In 2012 Z92 switched formats to News/Talk airing Fox News/Talk radio programs. In August 2015 KMZE's frequency moved to 92.3 for better coverage area.

Current programs
Sports Nutz with Sean Gallagher and Colin Yee Weekdays 5-6pm - Local Sports Talk Show
Woodward Boomer Coach Show - Wednesdays at 6-7pm Sports
Heartland College Sports - Thursdays at 6-7pm

References

External links
KMZE's website

MZE
News and talk radio stations in the United States